Fugain is the third album by Herman van Doorn. It is published under the alias Hermanherman.

This album was #68 in the Netherlands.

Tracks
 Bravo, monsieur le monde
 Le printemps
 Fais comme l'oiseau
 Je n'aurai pas le temps
 Comme un soleil
 Chante
 Attention, mesdames et messieurs
 Forteresse
 Ne m'oublie pas
 Les rues de la grande ville
 La fête
 Dis-moi pourquoi
 Une belle histoire

References 

2010 albums